El Mamghar is a small village in western Mauritania. It is located in the Inchiri region.

Nearby towns and villages include Uad Guenifa (93.9 nm), Regbet Thila (4.1 nm), Iouik (32.4 nm), Diayane (211.6 nm), Tikattane (25.6 nm), Portendick (52.2 nm) and Hassi Guendres (125.3 nm).

Populated places in Mauritania
Inchiri Region